The Agriculture and Food Act of 1981 (also known as the 1981 U.S. Farm Bill) was the 4-year omnibus farm bill that continued and modified commodity programs through 1985. It set specific target prices for 4 years, eliminated rice allotments and marketing quotas, lowered dairy supports, and made other changes affecting a wide range of USDA activities. The next year this farm bill was amended to freeze the dairy price support level and mandate loan rates and acreage reserve provisions for the 1983 crops (Omnibus Budget Reconciliation Act of 1982). Again in 1984, amendments were adopted to freeze target prices, authorize paid land diversion for feed grains, upland cotton, and rice, and provide a wheat payment-in-kind program for 1984 (Agricultural Programs Adjustment Act of 1984).

References 

United States federal agriculture legislation